Beti No.1 is a 2000 Hindi-language comedy drama film, written by Santosh Saroj and directed by T. Rama Rao. The film was released on 10 November 2000. It is a remake of the Malayalam film Aadyathe Kanmani.

The film stars Govinda, Rambha, Aruna Irani and Johnny Lever, while Prem Chopra, Ashok Saraf, Laxmikant Berde and Rakesh Bedi appear in supporting roles. Well known villain Prem Chopra played a rare positive role in this film. The film opened to highly negative reviews and flopped.

Plot
The story of Beti No.1 deals with how our society has given women a very inferior position. It is the story of Durga Devi (Aruna Irani) whose hen-pecked husband Dashrath Bhatnagar is a gharjamai. The couple has three sons, Ram (Ashok Saraf), Laxman (Laxmikant Berde) and Bharat (Govinda). Durga Devi has said that she will bequeath all her wealth to her first grandson however her first two sons, Ram and Laxman who are both married have so far only produced daughters, due to this both the wives and their daughters are shunned from the family.

In the meantime, the youngest son Bharat starts to romance Priya (Rambha), a girl of poor stock who works at a telephone booth. They fall in love, however, Durga Devi objects to Bharat engaging in a relationship with an impoverished girl. To prevent Durga Devi from discovering their relationship, Bharat's father, Dashrath (Prem Chopra), provides him and Priya with two lakhs, and they subsequently marry. They live happily together until Durga Devi discovers that they have been deceiving her, and she lashes out at Dashrath and Bharat. Durga Devi fires her maid and makes the new bride, Priya do all the household chores.

As time passes, Priya falls pregnant and is foretold that her child will bring great happiness in the family by Durga Devi's father. Everyone assumes that this means Priya is carrying a son as a daughter could not possibly bring happiness to the family. Durga Devi's behaviour suddenly changes towards Priya and Priya is treated like a princess as she is carrying the requisite heir. However, on a visit to the doctor, Bharat and Priya are informed that they are having a girl and not a son. They soon realise that if Durga Devi ever finds out that they are having a girl then she will once again treat Priya poorly so they decide to play along with the story that she is having a boy. At the time of Priya's delivery, Bharat's friend Mulayamchand's wife is also having a baby. Both wives go into labour together with Priya delivering a girl and Mullu's wife delivering a boy. Durga Devi suddenly collapses and ends up in the same hospital. Bharat's Father sees Bharat holding Mullu's son in his arms, mistakes him for his grandson and runs with the child to revive the ailing Durga Devi. Three days later, Durga Devi insists on taking her son home. Bharat persuades Mullu and his wife to live closer to their home and convinces Mullu and his wife to let them keep their son during the day and would be returned to them during the night and in turn they could keep their daughter during the day and would be taken back at night.

The story goes on and on with the two mothers running from house to house trying to soothe their own respective child until one day they are caught by Durga Devi where she comes to the clichéd realisation that she made a mistake in wanting a son and accepts her granddaughters.

Cast
Govinda as Bharat D. Bhatnagar
Rambha as Priya Bhatnagar
Aruna Irani as Durga D. Bhatnagar
Ashok Saraf as Ram D. Bhatnagar
Laxmikant Berde as Laxman D. Bhatnagar
Prem Chopra as Dashrath Bhatnagar
Rakesh Bedi as Bachalal
 Birbal as G.K. Exports Employee
Avtar Gill as Ramakant Sinha
Mohan Joshi as Raghuveer Yadav
Satyendra Kapoor as Priya's Father
Razak Khan as Talwar Singh Chura
Johnny Lever as Mulayamchand a.k.a. Mullu
Ram Mohan as Bhima Shankar
Ashalata Wabgaonkar as Priya's Mother
Guddi Maruti as Mullu's Maid

Soundtrack

The soundtrack of Beti No.1 is composed by Viju Shah and Lyrics Penned By Maya Govind and Dev Kohli. The film has 7 original songs,  The soundtrack was released in 1999 By T-Series ."Mehfil Taa Sandi" is an exact copy of a Pakistani Punjabi song sung by Musarat Nazir by the same name.

Track list

Box office
Although a film directed by an established director Rama Rao and written by Santosh Saroj (who also wrote Agneepath), the film was a huge disaster at the box office.

References

External links

 Beti No.1 on YouTube

Hindi remakes of Malayalam films
2000s Hindi-language films
2000 films
2000 comedy-drama films
Films set in India
Films directed by T. Rama Rao
Films scored by Viju Shah
Indian comedy-drama films